Waldorf Astoria Hotel & Residences Philadelphia was a proposed skyscraper in the city of Philadelphia, Pennsylvania. It was to be built in the former One Meridian Plaza lot, half of which is now occupied by The Residences at The Ritz-Carlton. The project comprised a /58-floor tower located at 1441 Chestnut Street and was to be completed by Waldorf Astoria Philadelphia by the year 2012. This hotel would have been a property of the developing Waldorf-Astoria Collection, a luxury chain of hotels and resorts, owned by Hilton Hotels Corporation but the project was canceled and the lot was sold in 2010.

In its place, a new Starwood W Hotel and Element by Westin hotel has secured approval, and construction is planned to start fall 2013.

References

Skyscrapers in Philadelphia
Proposed skyscrapers in the United States